The Garden Of Truth: The Vision and Promise of Sufism, Islam's Mystical Tradition is a 2007 book by the Iranian philosopher Seyyed Hossein Nasr.

References

Sources
 

Seyyed Hossein Nasr
Books about Islam
Sufi literature